DNA-damage inducible 1 homolog 1 (S. cerevisiae) is a protein. In humans it is encoded by the DDI1 gene.

References

Further reading

External links 
 PDBe-KB provides an overview of all the structure information available in the PDB for Human Protein DDI1 homolog 1 

Human proteins